Cyril August Chami (9 February 1964 – 5 November 2020) was a Tanzanian CCM politician and Member of Parliament for the Moshi Rural constituency from 2005 to 2015.

Chami was a Member of Parliament in the National Assembly of Tanzania, having won the seat of Moshi Rural as a Chama Cha Mapinduzi (CCM) candidate in the 2005 parliamentary election after the seat had been held by the opposition for ten years. Following this victory, he was appointed Deputy Minister for Foreign Affairs and International Cooperation on January 4, 2006. He was subsequently moved to the position of Deputy Minister for Trade Industries and Marketing on February 12, 2008. He also served as the Minister of Industry, Trade and Marketing from 2010 to 2012.

References

1964 births
2020 deaths
Chama Cha Mapinduzi MPs
Tanzanian MPs 2005–2010
Tanzanian MPs 2010–2015
University of Dar es Salaam alumni
University of Alberta alumni